Mairbek Vakhaevich  Taisumov (Russian: Майрбек Вахаевич Тайсумов; born August 8, 1988 in Chechnya) is a Russian-born Austrian mixed martial artist. He fights in the lightweight division. A professional mixed martial artist since 2007, Taisumov has previously competed in the Ultimate Fighting Championship and M-1 Global.

Early and personal life
Taisumov was born on August 8, 1988, in Grozny, the capital of the modern-day Chechen Republic of Russia. He is from the Yalkhoy (Biytro gar) teip (clan). He fights out of Vienna, Austria and trains at MMA Vienna and Tiger Muay Thai in Phuket, Thailand. He started his sporting career as a football player before realizing fighting was his true passion and devoting his career to martial arts. He made his professional MMA debut in 2007. He is a devout Sunni Muslim. In July 2018, Taisumov got a Moroccan citizenship to aid him in getting a U.S. visa.

Mixed martial arts career

M-1 Global
Taisumov spent much of his career fighting for M-1 Global. He made his M-1 Global debut against Borys Mankowski on February 5, 2010, winning via TKO in the second round.

Taisumov knocked out Julien Boussuge in the first round on May 29, 2010, at M-1 Selection 2010: Western Europe Round 3.

Taisumov submitted Serhiy Adamchuk in the first round on July 22, 2010, to win the M-1 Selection 2010: Eastern Europe Tournament.

Taisumov was poked in the eye by Artem Damkovsky in the third round of a M-1 Global Lightweight Championship bout on October 28, 2010, and lost via doctor stoppage.

Taisumov defeated M-1 veteran Yuri Ivlev by second-round TKO on March 5, 2011, at M-1 Challenge 23.

Taisumov knocked out Josh Bacallao in the first round on July 8, 2011, at M-1 Challenge 26.

Taisumov knocked out Joshua Thorpe in the second round on November 20, 2011, at M-1 Global: Fedor vs Monson.

Taisumov lost a split decision to Marat Gafurov on June 21, 2012, at M-1 Global: Fedor vs Rizzo.

Taisumov was expected to face Musa Khamanaev for the M-1 Global Lightweight Championship on November 15, 2012 at M-1 Challenge 35. The bout was cancelled for unknown reasons. Taisumov instead faced Leon Del Gaudio, whom he submitted in the first round.

Taisumov made Niko Puhakka submit to first-round leg kicks on June 8, 2013, at M-1 Challenge 40.

In his final M-1 Global bout, Taisumov submitted Artem Damkovsky in the third round of a rematch on November 30, 2013, at M-1 Challenge 44.

Ultimate Fighting Championship
Taisumov made his UFC debut against Tae Hyun Bang on January 4, 2014, at UFC Fight Night 34, winning a dominant unanimous decision.

Taisumov was expected to face UFC veteran Gleison Tibau on March 23, 2014, at UFC Fight Night 38. Tibau pulled out of the bout due to a knee injury and was replaced by Michel Prazeres, who won a dominant unanimous decision.

Taisumov beat newcomer Marcin Bandel by first-round TKO on October 4, 2014, at UFC Fight Night 53.

Taisumov was expected to face Yan Cabral on January 24, 2015, at UFC on Fox 14. Cabral pulled out of the fight due to a knee injury and was replaced by promotional newcomer Anthony Christodoulou, who Taisumov knocked out in the second round.

His contract up, Taisumov announced a new five-fight contract on Twitter on February 8, 2015.

Taisumov beat Alan Patrick by second-round TKO on June 20, 2015, at UFC Fight Night 69, earning a "Performance of the Night" bonus of $50,000.

Taisumov was expected to face Beneil Dariush on January 17, 2016, at UFC Fight Night 81. Dariush pulled out of the fight in early December citing injury and was replaced by Chris Wade. However, Taisumov was removed from the fight over reported visa issues and was replaced by Mehdi Baghdad.

Taisumov beat promotional newcomer Damir Hadžović by TKO on April 10, 2016, at UFC Fight Night 86, earning his second $50,000 "Performance of the Night" bonus.

Taisumov was expected to face Nik Lentz at UFC 203 on September 10, 2016. However, Taisumov was removed from the fight during the week before the event over reported visa issues and was replaced by promotional newcomer Michael McBride.

Taisumov was expected to face Joaquim Silva on May 28, 2017 at UFC Fight Night 109. However, Taisumov pulled out of the fight on May 16 citing a knee injury. He was replaced by Reza Madadi.

Taisumov faced UFC newcomer Felipe Silva on September 2, 2017 at UFC Fight Night: Struve vs. Volkov. He won the fight by knockout in the first round. The win earned Taisumov his third consecutive Performance of the Night bonus award.

Taisumov was expected to face Evan Dunham on April 7, 2018 at UFC 223. However, Taisumov was removed from the fight on March 9 again over reported visa issues. Dunham will now face Olivier Aubin-Mercier at the event.

Taisumov faced Desmond Green on September 15, 2018 at UFC Fight Night 136. At weigh-ins, Taisumov weighted five pounds over the lightweight non-title fight limit of 156 and was fined 40% of his purse to Green. Taisumov won the fight by unanimous decision.

On April 11, 2019, it was reported that USADA issued a six-month suspension for testing positive of stanozolol metabolites in an in-competition sample collected on September 15, 2018 at UFC Fight Night 136. USADA and World Anti-Doping Agency (WADA) determined the stanozolol metabolites were found from contaminated dietary supplements he digested. The suspension was retroactive to October 8, 2018 and he was eligible to fight again on May 8, 2019.

Taisumov faced Carlos Diego Ferreira on September 7, 2019 at UFC 242. He lost the fight by unanimous decision. The fight was the last one of his prevailing contract thus making him a free agent. Later in an interview Taisumov told that he is entertaining offers from other promotions meanwhile holding an option to resign with the UFC.

Championships and accomplishments

Mixed martial arts
Ultimate Fighting Championship
Performance of the Night (Three times)

Mixed martial arts record

|-
|Loss
|align=center| 27–6
|Carlos Diego Ferreira
|Decision (unanimous)
|UFC 242 
|
|align=center|3
|align=center|5:00
|Abu Dhabi, United Arab Emirates
|
|-
|Win
|align=center|27–5
|Desmond Green
|Decision (unanimous)
|UFC Fight Night: Hunt vs. Oliynyk 
|
|align=center|3
|align=center|5:00
|Moscow, Russia
|
|-
|Win
|align=center|26–5
|Felipe Silva
| KO (punch)
|UFC Fight Night: Volkov vs. Struve 
|
|align=center| 1
|align=center| 1:24
|Rotterdam, Netherlands
| 
|-
|Win
|align=center|25–5
|Damir Hadžović
|KO (punch)
|UFC Fight Night: Rothwell vs. dos Santos
|
|align=center|1
|align=center|3:44
|Zagreb, Croatia
| 
|-
| Win
| align=center| 24–5
| Alan Patrick
| TKO (head kick and punches)
| UFC Fight Night: Jedrzejczyk vs. Penne
| 
| align=center| 2
| align=center| 1:30
| Berlin, Germany
| 
|-
| Win
| align=center| 23–5
| Anthony Christodoulou
| KO (punches)
| UFC on Fox: Gustafsson vs. Johnson
| 
| align=center| 2
| align=center| 0:38
| Stockholm, Sweden
| 
|-
| Win
| align=center| 22–5
| Marcin Bandel
| TKO (punches)
| UFC Fight Night: Nelson vs. Story
| 
| align=center| 1
| align=center| 1:01
| Stockholm, Sweden
| 
|-
| Loss
| align=center| 21–5
| Michel Prazeres
| Decision (unanimous)
| UFC Fight Night: Shogun vs. Henderson 2
| 
| align=center| 3
| align=center| 5:00
| Natal, Brazil
| 
|-
| Win
| align=center| 21–4
| Tae Hyun Bang
| Decision (unanimous)
| UFC Fight Night: Saffiedine vs. Lim
| 
| align=center| 3
| align=center| 5:00
| Marina Bay, Singapore
| 
|-
| Win
| align=center| 20–4
| Artem Damkovsky
| Submission (rear-naked choke)
| M-1 Global - M-1 Challenge 44
| 
| align=center| 3
| align=center| 2:25
| Tula, Russia
|
|-
| Win
| align=center| 19–4
| Niko Puhakka
| Submission (leg kicks)
| M-1 Global - M-1 Challenge 40
| 
| align=center| 1
| align=center| 1:32
| Ingushetia, Russia
| 
|-
| Win
| align=center| 18–4
| Leon Del Gaudio
| Submission (guillotine choke)
| M-1 Challenge 35 - Emelianenko vs. Monson
| 
| align=center| 1
| align=center| 3:45
| Saint Petersburg, Russia
| 
|-
| Loss
| align=center| 17–4
| Marat Gafurov
| Decision (split)
| M-1 Global - Fedor vs. Rizzo
| 
| align=center| 3
| align=center| 5:00
| Saint Petersburg, Russia
|
|-
| Win
| align=center| 17–3
| Luca Poclit
| Submission (punches)
| EMS - Middleweight Tournament Opening Round
| 
| align=center| 1
| align=center| 1:57
| Iași, Romania
| 
|-
| Win
| align=center| 16–3
| Joshua Thorpe
| KO (punches)
| M-1 Global: Fedor vs. Monson
| 
| align=center| 2
| align=center| 3:19
| Moscow, Russia
|
|-
| Win
| align=center| 15–3
| Josh Bacallao
| KO (punch)
| M-1 Challenge 26: Garner vs. Bennett 2
| 
| align=center| 1
| align=center| 2:01
| Costa Mesa, California, United States
| 
|-
| Win
| align=center| 14–3
| Yuri Ivlev
| TKO (punches)
| M-1 Challenge 23: Guram vs. Grishin
| 
| align=center| 2
| align=center| 1:38
| Moscow, Russia
| 
|-
| Win
| align=center| 13–3
| Ivica Trušček
| Submission (rear-naked choke)
| GCF 1 - Judgement Day
| 
| align=center| 1
| align=center| 1:19
| Prague, Czech Republic
| 
|-
| Loss
| align=center| 12–3
| Artem Damkovsky
| TKO (doctor stoppage)
| M-1 Challenge 21: Guram vs. Garner
| 
| align=center| 3
| align=center| 2:52
| Saint Petersburg, Russia
| 
|-
| Win
| align=center| 12–2
| Serhiy Adamchuk
| Submission (rear-naked choke)
| M-1 Selection 2010: Eastern Europe Finals
| 
| align=center| 1
| align=center| 3:04
| Moscow, Russia
| 
|-
| Win
| align=center| 11–2
| Julien Boussuge 	
| KO (punch)
| M-1 Selection 2010: Western Europe Round 3
| 
| align=center| 1
| align=center| 4:11
| Uusimaa, Finland
| 
|-
| Win
| align=center| 10–2
| Petr Cajnak 	
| Submission (rear-naked choke)
| HC 5 - Hell Cage 5
| 
| align=center| 1
| align=center| 0:26
| Prague, Czech Republic
| 
|-
| Win
| align=center| 9–2
| Borys Mańkowski
| TKO (punches)
| M-1 Selection 2010: Western Europe Round 1
| 
| align=center| 2
| align=center| 0:55
| Hilversum, Netherlands
| 
|-
| Win
| align=center| 8–2
| Markus Niskanen
| TKO (punches)
| Cage 11 - Battle of Nations
| 
| align=center| 2
| align=center| 4:58
| Tavastia Proper, Finland
| 
|-
| Win
| align=center| 7–2
| Olivier Elizabeth	
| Submission (rear-naked choke) 
| HC 4 - Hell Cage 4
| 
| align=center| 1
| align=center| 1:32
| Prague, Czech Republic
| 
|-
| Win
| align=center| 6–2
| Jarkko Latomaki
| TKO (injury)
| BP - Fight Night Vaasa
| 
| align=center| 1
| align=center| 1:32
| Ostrobothnia, Finland
| 
|-
| Loss
| align=center| 5–2
| Vener Galiev 
| Decision (unanimous)
| Gladiator - 2009
| 
| align=center| 2
| align=center| 5:00
| Prague, Czech Republic
| 
|-
| Win
| align=center| 5–1
| David Rosmon
| KO (knee)
| HC 3 - Hell Cage 3
| 
| align=center| 1
| align=center| 4:10
| Prague, Czech Republic
| 
|-
| Loss
| align=center| 4–1
| Ivan Buchinger
| Submission (bulldog choke)
| HC 2 - Hell Cage 2
| 
| align=center| 2
| align=center| 3:12
| Prague, Czech Republic
| 
|-
| Win
| align=center| 4–0
| Maxim Usmaniev
| Submission (armbar)
| FA 3 - Fight Arena 3	
| 
| align=center| 1
| align=center| 0:00
| Prague, Czech Republic
| 
|-
| Win
| align=center| 3–0
| Oto Merlin
| TKO (punches) 
| FSC 1 - Fight Stage Championship 1
| 
| align=center| 0
| align=center| 0:00
| Košice, Slovakia
| 
|-
| Win
| align=center| 2–0
| Jaroslav Poborský
| KO (punches) 
| GFF 7 - Gladiators Free Fight 7
| 
| align=center| 1
| align=center| 1:44
| Prague, Czech Republic
| 
|-
| Win
| align=center| 1–0
| Vaclav Pribyl
| Submission (armbar) 
| CF 2 - Cage Fighting 2
| 
| align=center| 2
| align=center| 0:00
| Mecklenburg-Vorpommern, Germany
|

See also
 List of current UFC fighters
 List of male mixed martial artists

References

External links
 
 

1988 births
Living people
Austrian male mixed martial artists
Russian male mixed martial artists
Chechen mixed martial artists
Lightweight mixed martial artists
Mixed martial artists utilizing Muay Thai
Mixed martial artists utilizing wrestling
Mixed martial artists utilizing Brazilian jiu-jitsu
Chechen Muay Thai practitioners
Chechen practitioners of Brazilian jiu-jitsu
Austrian Muay Thai practitioners
Austrian practitioners of Brazilian jiu-jitsu
Sportspeople from Grozny
Russian expatriates in Austria
Naturalised citizens of Austria
Doping cases in mixed martial arts
Ultimate Fighting Championship male fighters
Russian people of Chechen descent
Russian Sunni Muslims
Austrian Muslims